The Los Robles Gate is a historic site in Tallahassee, Florida. It is located at the intersection of Thomasville and Meridian Roads. On September 21, 1989, it was added to the U.S. National Register of Historic Places.

The historic Los Robles subdivision, just east of Lake Ella and adjoining midtown, was developed beginning in the 1920s and began a trend of expansion to the north of downtown.  Los Robles is Spanish for "The Oak Trees" named after the centuries-old live oaks throughout the neighborhood.

References

External links

 Leon County listings at Florida's Office of Cultural and Historical Programs

National Register of Historic Places in Tallahassee, Florida
Buildings and structures in Tallahassee, Florida
Gates in the United States
History of Tallahassee, Florida
1926 establishments in Florida
Buildings and structures completed in 1926